The 1962 New Mexico gubernatorial election took place on November 6, 1962 to elect the Governor of New Mexico. Incumbent Republican Edwin L. Mechem ran for reelection to a second term.

Democratic primary
The Democratic primary was won by state representative Jack M. Campbell.

Results

Republican primary

General election

Results

References

1962
gubernatorial
New Mexico
November 1962 events in the United States